Réka Szilvay (born 1972) is a Finnish classical violinist. She was born in Helsinki, Finland, into an Austrian–Hungarian family. She is the daughter of the violinist Géza Szilvay and the niece of the cellist Csaba Szilvay.

References

Finnish classical violinists
Hungarian classical violinists
Finnish people of Hungarian descent
Living people
1972 births
Musicians from Helsinki
21st-century classical violinists
Women classical violinists